This is a list of British television related events in 1926.

Events
 26 January – Scottish inventor John Logie Baird demonstrates his pioneering greyscale mechanical television system (which he calls a "televisor") at his London laboratory for members of the Royal Institution and a reporter from The Times.

Births
 25 January – Richard Davies, Welsh actor (died 2015)
 22 February – Kenneth Williams, comedy actor (died 1988)
 8 May – David Attenborough, naturalist and broadcaster
 13 May – Eric Morecambe, comedy performer (died 1984)
 21 October – Leonard Rossiter, comedy actor and writer (died 1984)
 31 October – Jimmy Savile, disc jockey, television presenter, philanthropist and serial sex offender (died 2011)
 30 November – Sydney Lotterby, comedy producer (died 2020)
 19 December – Stephen Lewis, comedy actor (On the Buses) (died 2014)

See also
 1926 in British music
 1926 in the United Kingdom

References

 
 Crisell, A. (2002). An introductory history of British broadcasting. Routledge.
 
 Cooke, L. (2003). British television drama : a history . London: BFI Pub.
 

1926 in British television